The 1974–75 Serie A season was won by Juventus.

Teams
Varese, Ascoli and Ternana had been promoted from Serie B while Foggia and Genoa was relegated but Verona was disqualified to Serie B.

Final classification

Results

Top goalscorers

References and sources
Almanacco Illustrato del Calcio - La Storia 1898-2004, Panini Edizioni, Modena, September 2005

External links
  - All results on RSSSF Website.

1974-75
Italy
1